Eriphioidea is a superfamily of crabs, containing the six families Dairoididae, Eriphiidae, Hypothalassiidae, Menippidae, Oziidae and Platyxanthidae. They are united by a number of characters, including a marked difference in size between the left and right claws, where the larger one has a crushing tooth, and the smaller one does not, and the relative breadth of the male abdomen.

References

External links

 
Crabs
Arthropod superfamilies